Invisible Boy or variant, may refer to:

 Invisible person, a SF concept
 The Invisible Boy (aka S.O.S Spaceship), a 1957 U.S. science fiction film
 The Invisible Boy (2014 film), an Italian superhero film
 Boy (The Invisibles), alter-ego of Lucille Butler, a DC Comics character created by Grant Morrison, see List of The Invisibles characters
 Danny Dunn, Invisible Boy (aka Invisible Boy) a 1974 juvenile science fiction adventure novel by  Raymond Abrashkin and Jay Williams
 Invisible Boy (short story), a 1945 short story by Ray Bradbury, collected in the 1953 Bradbury anthology The Golden Apples of the Sun

See also

 The Invisible Man (disambiguation)
 Invisible Girl (disambiguation)
 The Last Invisible Boy, 2008 children's novel by Evan Kuhlman